Miguel Angel Perrichon Segóvia  (born 30 March 1941), known as Miguel Perrichon, is a former Argentine professional football player.

Perrichon scored the winning goal in the 1966 Taça de Portugal Final, which granted Braga its first Taça de Portugal in its history.

References

External links
 
 

1941 births
Living people
Footballers from Córdoba, Argentina
Argentine footballers
Association football forwards
Talleres de Córdoba footballers
Segunda Divisão players
Boavista F.C. players
Primeira Liga players
S.C. Braga players
Liga MX players
CD Oro footballers
Irapuato F.C. footballers
Club Necaxa footballers
Toronto Blizzard (1971–1984) players
Georgia Generals players
Argentine expatriate footballers
Expatriate footballers in Portugal
Expatriate footballers in Mexico
Expatriate soccer players in Canada
Expatriate soccer players in the United States
Argentine expatriate sportspeople in Canada
Argentine expatriate sportspeople in Mexico
Argentine expatriate sportspeople in Portugal